Talal Al-Zahrani (born December 8, 1981) is a Saudi football player who plays a defender .

References

1981 births
Living people
Saudi Arabian footballers
Al Jeel Club players
Hajer FC players
Al-Adalah FC players
Saudi First Division League players
Saudi Second Division players
Saudi Professional League players
Association football defenders